The men's 200 metres event at the 2009 Summer Universiade was held on 9–10 July.

Medalists

Results

Heats
Qualification: First 3 of each heat (Q) and the next 2 fastest (q) qualified for the quarterfinals.

Wind:Heat 1: +1.0 m/s, Heat 2: +1.3 m/s, Heat 3: -0.7 m/s, Heat 4: -0.6 m/s, Heat 5: +0.2 m/sHeat 6: +2.1 m/s, Heat 7: -0.5 m/s, Heat 8: -0.5 m/s, Heat 9: +0.9 m/s, Heat 10: -0.7 m/s

Quarterfinals
Qualification: First 3 of each heat (Q) and the next 4 fastest (q) qualified for the semifinals.

Wind:Heat 1: +0.5 m/s, Heat 2: +1.6 m/s, Heat 3: -0.7 m/s, Heat 4: +0.8 m/s

Semifinals
Qualification: First 4 of each semifinal qualified directly (Q) for the final.

Wind:Heat 1: +0.9 m/s, Heat 2: -0.2 m/s

Final
Wind: +0.1 m/s

References

External links 
Results (archived)

200
2009